John Moore is a costume designer, set decorator, and production designer for films. He was nominated for the Academy Award for Best Art Direction for El Cid. Additional credits include A Farewell to Arms, 55 Days at Peking, The Fall of the Roman Empire, and A Matter of Time.

During the 1960s and 1970s he also worked for the Salzburg Festivals where he designed the settings for Il rappresentazione die anima e di corpo, Der Rosenkavalier and Jedermann in cooperation with Veniero Colasanti.

References

External links

Costume designers
Production designers
Art directors
Set decorators
Year of birth missing
Possibly living people